Erythrolamprus subocularis is a species of snake in the family Colubridae. The species is found in Ecuador.

References

Erythrolamprus
Reptiles of Ecuador
Endemic fauna of Ecuador
Reptiles described in 1902
Taxa named by George Albert Boulenger